Ham Sandwich (stylized as HamsandwicH) are an Irish indie rock band from Kells, County Meath.

The band originally consisted of Niamh Farrell (vocals), Podge McNamee (vocals and guitar), Brian Darcy (guitar and piano), and Ollie Murphy (drums). On 12 April 2010, the band hired David McEnroe.

To date, the band have released Four studio albums: Carry the Meek (2008), White Fox (2010) and Stories from the Surface (2015) and Magnify (2022)

History

Formation and early years (2003-06)
Ham Sandwich was formed by Podge McNamee and Niamh Farrell at a crucifixion party on Good Friday 2003, initially with McNamee as guitarist and McNamee and Farrell as vocalists.  McNamee and Fred Cooke had been friends since childhood, growing up in Kells, County Meath, and Farrell had befriended McNamee upon her recent return to Ireland after spending several years in Scotland. Brian Darcy, who McNamee had known from school, was recruited as a guitarist and Ollie Murphy joined soon after as the group's drummer. They suggested the band's name at an early rehearsal session, initially as a joke, before it was officially adopted by the band. The band initially faced much criticism for their unusual name, most notably by U2 frontman Bono, but Farrell has defended the choice to keep the name stating: "I suppose we were a bit stubborn at first and then I think it got so far that we couldn't change it because then we would have been known as 'so-and-so, formerly known as 'Ham Sandwich' and there's nothing worse than having to put that on a poster, but people have started warming to it."

The band spent the next year writing and rehearsing songs, with their then bass player as their primary songwriter, before giving their first live performance in their home town of Kells. They released their debut single, "Sad Songs", in August 2005.  Rather than seeking a record label contract, the band published the single on their own independent label, Route 109A Records, named for the bus route between Kells and Dublin. The decision to release their first single independently, rather than seek a major record label deal, came from a desire to work and develop at their own pace, as well as to retain control over their own music. All of the band's subsequent releases have been on their own label. The band continued to tour around Ireland throughout 2006, releasing two further singles, "St. Christopher" on 20 February and "Words" on 19 September.

Carry the Meek and White Fox (2007-13)
On 16 February 2007, Ham Sandwich released their fourth single, "click..click...BOOM!!!" This was followed by a short tour of Ireland in support of the release. The band made their Irish television debut in February, performing the single on The Late Late Show. Later that year, the band began work on their first album, Carry the Meek, having enlisted Irish musician Karl Odlum as producer. The album was recorded in a home-made studio at Headfort House in Kells. The album was released on 15 February 2008 and received generally favourable reviews in the Irish media.  On the same day the band won the Hope for 2008 Award at the Meteor Music Awards. The band released three more singles from the album 2008, "Keepsake", "Never Talk" and "Broken Glass", and embarked on tours of Ireland and the UK, including spots at Glastonbury and Electric Picnic.

On 6 November 2009, Ham Sandwich released "Out of the Darkness", the first single from their planned sophomore album, although it did not appear on the album when it was eventually released. On 15 July 2010 the band's manager, Derek Nally, died after suffering a heart attack. Despite the personal turmoil, the band re-entered the studio to start work on their second album afresh, with Karl Odlum returning as producer as well as filling in on bass guitar duties. On 7 May 2010, the band released their next single, "The Naturist". Their second album, White Fox, was released on 1 October 2010 and was dedicated to Nally. The band continued to tour, with David McEnroe filling in on bass, and released the next single from the album, "OH-OH", on 18 October 2010.

On 4 February 2011, "Ants" was released as the third single from the album. Although the song failed to chart, the video became a viral hit and won the Best Concept award at the 2011 IMTV Awards.  The band's next single, "Models", was released on 15 June 2011 and was later used extensively in the Discover Ireland TV and radio campaign in support of The Gathering initiative in 2013. In December, the band finished off the year with performances on the Irish television show Other Voices, as part of its 10-year anniversary celebrations, and at the New Year's celebrations at The Village. The band continued to tour throughout 2012 and 2013, playing their first headline show at Dublin's Academy on 18 February 2012. The final single from White Fox, "Long Distance", was released in June 2012. Other notable performances included playing at the President of Ireland's Garden Party at Áras an Uachtaráin and supporting Bon Jovi at Slane Castle, both in June 2013.

Stories from the Surface (2014-present)
Having toured extensively in support of White Fox, Ham Sandwich began recording their third album at Windmill Lane Studios in 2014, with Karl Odlum once again producing.  On 30 March 2014 the band debuted "Illuminate", the first single from the new album, prior to their first headlining gig at the Olympia Theatre. That year saw Niamh Farrell present televised coverage of the Choice Music Prize. Following support gigs over the summer for Arcade Fire and Mumford and Sons, the band released the second single, "Apollo" on 31 October 2014 as a free download on their website. On 9 February 2015, the band announced that their third album, Stories from the Surface, would be released on 17 April 2015. It was released to generally positive reviews and became the band's first album to top the Irish album charts. A third single, "Fandango", was released prior to the album on 13 March 2015.

Stories from the Surface was nominated for the Choice music Prize 'Best album of 2015'. On 3 March it was held in Vicar street to a sold-out audience with solo artist Soak walking away with the prize for best album for 2015. In October 2015, the band travelled to the CMJ music festival in New York city playing a handful of shows.

The band released an animated video for their track "Satellite" by artist Mark Corrigan in March 2016. In November 2016 the track "All Worthwhile" was released with a video showing clips of the band since its inception.

The band released a new track entitled "Bodies" in November 2017 heralding a new direction for the band. The track was very well received and became playlisted on a number of national radio stations.

Personnel 
Current members
Niamh Farrell - lead vocals (2003–present)
Podge McNamee - lead vocals, guitar (2003–present)
Brian Darcy - guitar (2003–present)

Former members
David McEnroe - bass (2010–2017)
Ollie Murphy - drums (2003–2019)

Discography

Studio albums

Singles

References

External links
 Official website
 Facebook
 MySpace

Irish indie rock groups
Musical groups established in 2003
Musicians from County Meath